is a form of lacquerware from Kamakura, Japan. It is made by carving patterns in wood, then lacquering it with layers of color. It is then polished.

In the Kamakura period (1185–1333), carved lacquer from the Song Dynasty of China was imported to Japan by Chin Na-kei (or Chin Wa-kei). However, many Japanese lacquer craftsmen did not adopt the Chinese method of depositing lacquer and then carving it; instead, they created Kamakura-bori, a method of carving wood and then coating lacquer.

Kamakura-bori was widely used as a box, stand or plate for daily necessities, Buddhist altar fittings and tea utensils.

References

See also 
 鎌倉彫 (Kamakura-bori) in the Japanese Wikipedia.

Japanese art terminology
Japanese lacquerware
Kamakura, Kanagawa